The ceremony for the 3rd Hundred Flowers Awards was held on May 23, 1980, in Beijing. The event was suspended seventeen years during the Cultural Revolution.

Awards

Best Film

Best Director

Best Screenplay

Best Actor

Best Actress

Best Supporting Actress

Best Animation

Best Chinese Opera Film

External links
China.com.cn
Today on History

1980